Battle of Surat, also known as the Sack of Surat, was a land battle that took place on January 5, 1664, near the city of Surat, in present-day Gujarat, India; between Maratha ruler Shivaji and Inayat Khan, a Mughal commander. The Marathas defeated the Mughal force, and ransacked the city of Surat for six days.

According to James Grant Duff, a captain in the British India Regiment, Surat was attacked by Shivaji on 5 January 1664. Surat was a wealthy port city in the Mughal Empire and was useful for the Mughals as it was used for the sea trade of the Arabian Sea. The city was well populated mostly by Hindus and Muslims, especially the officials in the Mughal administration of the city. The attack was so sudden that the population had no chance to flee. The plunder was continued for six days and two-thirds of the city was burnt down. The loot was then transferred to Rajgad fort.

Background
As Shaista Khan, the Mughal governor, was in Deccan for more than three years fighting the Marathas, the financial condition of the Maratha Kingdom was dire. So to improve his finances, Shivaji planned to attack Surat, a key Mughal power centre, and a wealthy port town that generated a million rupees in taxes. His aim was to capture and loot the wealthy port city and bring all the loot to his main residence, the Raigad Fort.

Battle

Composition of forces
Local Subedar, Inayat Khan who was appointed by Aurangzeb. After sacking the Mughal garrison, Shivaji attacked the Port of Surat and set the local shipping industry ablaze.

Shivaji was assisted by commanders along with a cavalry of 10000.

Movement and clash of forces
Shivaji attacked Surat after demand for the tribute was rejected. The Mughal Chieftains was very surprised by the suddenness of the attack, unwilling to face the Maratha forces, he hid himself in the Fort of Surat.

Surat was under attack for nearly three days, in which the Maratha army looted all possible wealth from traders of the Mughul Guzerat subah and others such as the Portuguese trading centers. The Maratha soldiers took away cash, gold, silver, pearls, rubies, diamonds& emeralds from the houses of rich merchants such as Virji Vora, Haji Zahid Beg, Haji Kasim and others. The business of Mohandas Parekh, the deceased broker of the Dutch East India Company, was spared as he was reputed as a charitable man. Similarly, 
Chhatrapati Shivaji did not plunder the houses of the foreign missionaries. The French traveller Francois Bernier wrote this in his Travels in Mughal India:

Shivaji had to complete the sacking of Surat before the Mughal empire at Delhi was alerted, and he could not afford to spend much time attacking the English East India Company. Thus, Sir George Oxenden was able to successfully defend the Surat factory, a fortified warehouse-counting house-hostel.

Casualties
One Englishman named Anthony Smith, was captured by the Marathas, and funds were demanded from him. Smith wrote an account of him witnessing Shivaji ordering the cutting off of the heads and hands of those who concealed their wealth. However, when Shivaji realised that Smith was poor, he freed him. When the Mughal Army finally approached on the fourth fateful day, Shivaji and his Maratha soldiers had already started to return southwards into the Deccan.

Aftermath 
All this loot was transported to the Deccan before the Mughal Empire at Delhi was informed of the sacking of Surat. This wealth later was used for developing and strengthening the Maratha state. This event enraged the Mughal Emperor, Aurangzeb. The revenue of the Mughal Empire was reduced as trade did not flourish as much after Shivaji's raid on the Port of Surat.

See also 

 Battle of Sinhagad
 Battle of Burdwan
 Battle of Purandar

References

Bibliography

 James Grant Duff - History of Marathas
 S.D.Samant - Vedh Mahamanvacha
 Babasaheb Purandare - Raja ShivChhatrapati

1664 in India
Surat 1664
History of Surat
Surat
Surat
Looting